Return of the Mother is the ninth solo (and eleventh overall) studio album by Nina Hagen, released in 2000.

Track listing

Notes
"Poetenclub" is a homage to the Austrian popstar Falco who died two years before. In the song Nina Hagen sings over samples from interviews with Falco, thus creating a post-mortem duet.
"Der Wind hat mir ein Lied erzählt" and "Yes Sir" were previously sung by Zarah Leander. Nina Hagen also covered Zarah Leander's "Ich weiß es wird einmal ein Wunder geschehen" on the album Angstlos.
"Return of the Mother" is sung in English, "He Shiva Shankara" in Sanskrit, "Handgrenade" is an English version (with a different backing track) of "Höllenzug".

References

2000 albums
Nina Hagen albums
Albums produced by Reinhold Heil